Ásbjörn Óttarsson (born 16 November 1962 in Reykjavík) is an Icelandic politician.

External links
 Biography of Ásbjörn Óttarsson on the Parliament of Iceland website 

Asbjorn Ottarsson
Asbjorn Ottarsson
Living people
1962 births
21st-century Icelandic politicians